The 2016 PGA Tour Champions was the 37th season of PGA Tour Champions, a golf tour operated by the PGA Tour for men's golfers age 50 and over. The tour officially began in 1980 as the Senior PGA Tour, and was known by that name through 2002. It then was known as the Champions Tour from 2003 through 2015, after which it was rebranded as "PGA Tour Champions".

This season was the first for a playoff system to determine the winner of the Charles Schwab Cup as season champion. The playoff, similar to that used by the regular PGA Tour for the FedEx Cup, consists of three events and ends with the season-ending Charles Schwab Cup Championship.

Tournament results
The following table shows the official money events for the 2016 season. "Date" is the ending date of the tournament. The numbers in parentheses after the winners' names are the number of wins they will have on the tour up to and including that event. Senior majors are shown in bold.

Leaders
Scoring average leaders

Source:

Money list leaders

Source:

Career money list leaders

Source:

Awards

See also
Champions Tour awards
Champions Tour records

References

External links
PGA Tour Champions official site

PGA Tour Champions seasons
PGA Tour Champions